Pani Taram (born on 7 July 1975 at Koloriang) is Indian politician from the State of Arunachal Pradesh, He was elected as MLA of 21(ST) Koloriang in 2014 vidhan sabha election from the state of Arunachal Pradesh.
He was served as parliamentary secretary for Home, Education and Agriculture to the Government of Arunachal Pradesh in BJP Govt. Shri Pani Taram was defeated against two times MLA, Shri. Lokam Tassar, from 21-Koloriang (ST) Assembly Constituency in the 2014 Arunachal Pradesh Legislative Assembly election.
He resigned from his former government service, as the District Fisheries Development Officer (DFDO). Standing as a People's Party of Arunachal candidate. Graduated from Jawahar lal Nehru College, Pasighat, Arunachal Pradesh. He is a Science Graduate, B.Sc (Hons) by Qualification and 2 yrs PG Diploma in Fisheries Science from Central Institute of Fisheries Education, Saltlake City, Kolkotta (WB) under Deemed University of Fisheries Science, Mumbai.
Shri Pani Taram was adjudged as the Best MLA of India in 2017–18. 
Shri Pani Taram was selected among the 12 Best MLA of India. He is known for his best Orator and best Parliamentarian of 6th Legislative Assembly, Arunachal Pradesh.
Presently, he is working President of National People Party (NPP) State of Arunachal Pradesh.

See also
Arunachal Pradesh Legislative Assembly

References

External links
 Pani Taram profile
 MyNeta Profile
 Pani Taram - FB

People's Party of Arunachal politicians
Indian National Congress politicians
Arunachal Pradesh MLAs 2014–2019
Bharatiya Janata Party politicians from Arunachal Pradesh
Living people
1975 births
Janata Dal (United) politicians